Vinod Chandra Pandey (16 February 1932 – 7 February 2005) was an Indian Civil Servant of the Rajasthan Cadre, and was, notably, Cabinet Secretary in 1989–1990. He was a prolific writer and an erudite astrologer.  

He was born to a family which contributed two other Cabinet Secretaries (B. D. Pandey and Kamal Pandey).

He was Cabinet Secretary from 23 December 1989 to 11 December 1990 under Prime Minister V. P. Singh (and earlier, revenue secretary under him when the latter was Finance Minister). They had earlier studied together at Allahabad University.

He served as Governor of Bihar (1999–2003), Jharkhand (briefly during 2002), and Arunachal Pradesh (2003–04), as an appointee of the Atal Bihari Vajpayee government.

He had been a bachelor. He was a scholar of Hindi, Pali, and Sanskrit, and a prolific writer in Hindi. He died in Noida, Uttar Pradesh, two months after leaving the governorship of Arunachal Pradesh.

Further reading
Cabinet Secretariat, India
Bihar Raj Bhavan
Jharkhand Raj Bhavan
Transfer to Arunachal Raj Bhavan
Arunachal Raj Bhavan
Obituary

1932 births
2005 deaths
University of Allahabad alumni
V. P. Singh administration
Governors of Bihar
Governors of Jharkhand
Governors of Arunachal Pradesh
Cabinet Secretaries of India
Indian Administrative Service officers